These are the official results of the men's 3000 metres steeplechase event at the 1992 Summer Olympics in Barcelona, Spain. There were a total number of 33 participating athletes, with four qualifying heats.

At the gun, it seemed like the rest of the world came to run, while the Kenyan team were just tagging along.  Starting off slowly, all three Kenyans casually jogged around the outside of the pack and towards the front.  William Mutwol continued, breaking away to as much as a 10-metre lead, with Elarbi Khattabi the only one to bridge the gap.  On the next lap, Matthew Birir, running in fourth place, went down on the track, but Birir righted himself quickly and was back on his feet before the back of the strung out field had passed him.  Within two more barriers, he was back in the same fourth-place position.  By the time they reached the same spot on the track where Birir fell, he was in third place as the tail of the three man Kenyan breakaway.  Over the next two laps, the only athlete seriously marking the Kenyans was Alessandro Lambruschini.  Just after two laps to go, Patrick Sang edged ahead of Mutwol with Lambruschini gaining a little ground between barriers and losing the same amount each time he went over one.  With a lap to go, Birir moved into the lead and the Kenyan sweep simply pulled away from Lambruschini, with the rest of the field already disappeared behind.  No drama, no hurdling the water jump, no challenges, not even any sprinting.  Lambruschini finished fourth for the second Olympics in a row, more than 25 metres behind Mutwol. This became the first Olympic podium sweep by an African nation.

Medalists

Records
These were the standing world and Olympic records (in minutes) prior to the 1992 Summer Olympics.

Final
Held on August 7, 1992

Semifinals

Heats

Final ranking

See also
 1990 Men's European Championships 3,000 m Steeplechase (Split)
 1991 Men's World Championships 3,000 m Steeplechase (Tokyo)
 1993 Men's World Championships 3,000 m Steeplechase (Stuttgart)
 1994 Men's European Championships 3,000 m Steeplechase (Helsinki)
 1995 Men's World Championships 3,000 m Steeplechase (Gothenburg)

References

External links
 Official Report
 Results

S
Steeplechase at the Olympics
Men's events at the 1992 Summer Olympics